Simon Mason may refer to:

Simon Mason (field hockey) (born 1973), English field hockey goalkeeper
Simon Mason (author) (born 1962), British author